Jonas Sibley (March 7, 1762 – February 5, 1834) was a U.S. Representative from Massachusetts.

He was born in Sutton in the Province of Massachusetts Bay, and completed preparatory studies there.  He married Lydia Rice of Sutton. He was Selectman, Town moderator, and Town treasurer.  He served as member of the Massachusetts House of Representatives, and was a member of the Massachusetts State Senate.  He also served as delegate to the state constitutional convention in 1820.

Sibley was elected as an Adams-Clay Republican to the Eighteenth Congress (March 4, 1823 – March 3, 1825).  He was an unsuccessful candidate for reelection, then engaged in agricultural pursuits.  He died in Sutton on February 5, 1834, and was interred in Center Cemetery.

References

External links

 

1762 births
1834 deaths
People from Sutton, Massachusetts
Members of the Massachusetts House of Representatives
Massachusetts state senators
Democratic-Republican Party members of the United States House of Representatives from Massachusetts